Dave Ryan (born June 20, 1967) is a play-by-play announcer and reporter for CBS, who has worked a wide variety of sports programming including NFL, college basketball, lacrosse, bowling, baseball and hockey.

Education
Ryan graduated from Syracuse University's S. I. Newhouse School of Public Communications with a B.S. in Broadcast Journalism in 1989. He got his start in broadcasting at UUTV, now called CitrusTV, the student-run TV studio at Syracuse University. He is also Co-Director of Syracuse's Sportscaster U. program that instructs NBA players in broadcasting.

Career
He previously worked for ESPN. He previously called Rochester Rattlers games on ESPN3 with Evan Washburn. He is mostly known for calling PBA bowling events on the network alongside color commentator Randy Pedersen from 2002–2007.

He called other non-marquee sporting events on ESPN and its sister networks, such as lacrosse and the semifinals of the Little League World Series. In addition, he occasionally serves as a college football sideline reporter and a college basketball announcer and served as a play-by-play man for ESPN/ESPN2 for 8 years. His signature phrases on bowling telecasts were "60 feet to success!" and "He's got all ten down." Some bowling fans criticized him for calling pins by a number, such as "number seven" instead of saying "the seven pin." Ryan was replaced by Rob Stone for PBA telecasts in 2007, but he has continued to call other bowling events on occasion, such as women's tournaments and college tournaments.

Ryan's name is on a fairly short list of national bowling play-by-play announcers, with Chris Schenkel being the most well known after he spent 36 years calling PBA events for ABC. Denny Schreiner (ESPN), Jay Randolph (NBC/ESPN2), Mike Durbin (ESPN), Dick Stockton (HBO) and Rob Stone (ESPN/ FOX) have also served as play-by-play announcers for bowling telecasts.

Ryan joined the NFL on CBS commentary team in 2009 as a play by play man, substituting for Gus Johnson in week 16.

On February 2, 2012, Ryan agreed to call Major League Lacrosse games on the CBS Sports Network with Evan Washburn. Ryan also returned to PBA bowling broadcasts in June–July 2013, when CBS Sports Network covered five events in the PBA Tour's "Summer Swing."

Personal life
Ryan, along with his wife Tess and their four children, live in Baldwinsville, New York.

References

External links
 CBS Sports Bio

1967 births
Living people
American television sports announcers
Army Black Knights announcers
Baseball announcers
Bowling broadcasters
Curling broadcasters
College football announcers
College basketball announcers in the United States
Lacrosse announcers
Major League Lacrosse announcers
National Football League announcers
National Hockey League broadcasters
S.I. Newhouse School of Public Communications alumni
Television personalities from Syracuse, New York
Women's college basketball announcers in the United States